Line 4 of the Chengdu Metro is the third line to enter revenue service on the metro network in Chengdu, Sichuan. Line 4 runs in an east-west direction, stretching from Wansheng in Wenjiang to Xihe in the Longquanyi. The first phase started construction on July 22, 2011, and began operation on 26 December 2015. Testing began on the east of west extensions of Line 4 as part of Phase II expansion on December 10, 2016.

Opening timeline

Stations

References

Chengdu Metro lines
Railway lines opened in 2015
2015 establishments in China